fortyfivedownstairs is a not-for-profit theatre and gallery in Melbourne, Australia. Located on the lower floors of a brick nineteenth century building in Flinders Lane, it showcases visual art, independent theatre and live music. An institution that nurtures risk-taking artists, its board includes Julian Burnside QC.

References

Art museums and galleries in Melbourne
Contemporary art galleries in Australia
Theatres in Melbourne
Music venues in Melbourne
2002 establishments in Australia
Buildings and structures in Melbourne City Centre